Glenholme  is a suburb of Rotorua in the Bay of Plenty Region of New Zealand's North Island.

Demographics

Glenholme had a population of 4,665 at the 2018 New Zealand census, an increase of 390 people (9.1%) since the 2013 census, and an increase of 405 people (9.5%) since the 2006 census. There were 1,974 households, comprising 2,181 males and 2,484 females, giving a sex ratio of 0.88 males per female, with 807 people (17.3%) aged under 15 years, 900 (19.3%) aged 15 to 29, 1,947 (41.7%) aged 30 to 64, and 1,005 (21.5%) aged 65 or older.

Ethnicities were 58.8% European/Pākehā, 30.1% Māori, 5.1% Pacific peoples, 19.5% Asian, and 1.6% other ethnicities. People may identify with more than one ethnicity.

The percentage of people born overseas was 27.8, compared with 27.1% nationally.

Although some people chose not to answer the census's question about religious affiliation, 40.4% had no religion, 43.1% were Christian, 2.7% had Māori religious beliefs, 3.7% were Hindu, 0.5% were Muslim, 0.8% were Buddhist and 3.2% had other religions.

Of those at least 15 years old, 852 (22.1%) people had a bachelor's or higher degree, and 708 (18.4%) people had no formal qualifications. 453 people (11.7%) earned over $70,000 compared to 17.2% nationally. The employment status of those at least 15 was that 1,677 (43.5%) people were employed full-time, 573 (14.9%) were part-time, and 228 (5.9%) were unemployed.

Education

References

Suburbs of Rotorua
Populated places in the Bay of Plenty Region